Richard J. Cash (born March 31, 1960) is an American politician. He is a member of the South Carolina Senate from the 3rd District, serving since 2017. He is a member of the Republican party.

References

Living people
1960 births
Republican Party South Carolina state senators
21st-century American politicians
Furman University alumni
People from Jacksonville, Florida
Gordon–Conwell Theological Seminary alumni